Gumstix is an American multinational corporation headquartered in Redwood City, California. It develops and manufactures small system boards comparable in size to a stick of gum. In 2003, when it was first fully functional, it used ARM architecture system on a chip (SoC) and an operating system based on Linux 2.6 kernel. It has an online tool called Geppetto that allows users to design their own boards. In August 2013 it started a crowd-funding service to allow a group of users that want to get a custom design manufactured to share the setup costs.

See also
 Arduino
 Embedded system
 Raspberry Pi
 Stick PC

References

External links

 
 Gumstix users wiki
 Gumstix mailing list archives on nabble

Embedded Linux
Linux-based devices
Computer companies of the United States
Companies based in Redwood City, California
Network computer (brand)
Motherboard form factors
Motherboard companies
Privately held companies based in California
Single-board computers